Vannivelampatti, is a Gram panchayat in Madurai district in the Indian state of Tamil Nadu.

History
Vannivelampatti was known as vannivalampatti which means, a village (patti) situated at the right side of the strange Vanni Vinayaka facing west at the top of the Devankkurichi hill.

Groups based on belief
Earlier the village was divided as atheist group and another as non atheist group. Apart from regular Grama Panchayat, a Grama Committee was constructed by one Mr. Kailasam Pillai. a middle school teacher and was headed by him. Consequently, the rivalry among two groups was abolished and the village was integrated.

Self Development
The village follows a  rural development method called. Construction works were done by the grama committee without expecting any financial assistance from government. For instance, Teppakulam ( Water Tank) construction, funeral path and bridge. This is an efficient method of development and creates jobs internally and without government support.

Education
In 1950, the middle school teacher Mr. Kailasampillai, a native of this village and Mr. S.V. Subbiah, headmaster (a native of Karaikeni village) had started Noon meal scheme at the beginning of the 1950s (before noon meal scheme was introduced by state government by former chief minister of Tamil Nadu Mr. K. Kamaraj) by getting rice and pulses from farmers as donation during harvest season.

Culture

People of Vannivelampatti mainly worship Kaliamman & Mariamman incarnation of Amman. Every year a pongal festival will be celebrated in the month of June. Vannivelampatti is one of the 7 villages(Thevankurichi, T. Kallupatti, Vannivelampatti, Ammapatti, Kadaneri, Kilangulam, Satrapatti) to celebrate the Muthalamman festival every 2 years. 

 Vembulaiyan (Lord Shiva )Temple Located in South Side of the village is an Ancient symbol of the culture.
 Director Susi Ganesan belongs to Vannivelampatti and many young boys pursue a career in dancing and stage shows * Electrical Engineer R.KANNAN B.E.,EEE belongs to Vannivelampatti

Economy
Agriculture is the main occupation. People use T.Kallupatti as their main hub for all needs and also with Peraiyur.

Geography
Vannivelampatti is Situated 3 km far from T.Kallupatti which is on Madurai to Rajapalayam and Virudhunagar to Theni Highways.

References

Villages in Madurai district